Kunga Nima Lepcha is an Indian politician in Sikkim. He is the acting president of Sikkim Krantikari Morcha (SKM), incumbent member of Sikkim Legislative Assembly and the state Minister of Prem Singh Tamang ministry.

Political career
At first, Kunga Nima Lepcha was the member of the ruling party, Sikkim Democratic Front (SDF). In January 2004, he seceded from SDF and joined Sikkim Pradesh Congress Committee (SPCC: Sikkim branch of Indian National Congress (INC)). He became the spokesperson of SPCC at the later date. In 2004 and 2009 Sikkim Legislative Assembly election, he stood as the candidate of INC from Shyari constituency, but he lost and became a runner-up candidate in both elections.

In 20 April 2013, Kunga Nima Lepcha was elected to the president of SPCC after his predecessor, Nar Bahadur Bhandari's secession. However, in March 2014, Kunga Nima Lepcha seceded from SPCC and joined Sikkim Krantikari Morcha (SKM) which was led by Prem Singh Tamang (P. S. Golay). In 2014 Sikkim Legislative Assembly election, he stood as the SKM candidate from Shyari and won the seat.

In December 2015, 7 SKM Members of Sikkim Legislative Assembly defected to the ruling party SDF, but 2 other MLAs of SKM, Kunga Nima Lepcha and Sonam Lama stayed with their party.

In 2019 Sikkim Legislative Assembly election, he was nominated to 2 constituencies (Shyari and Gangtok). He won in both constituencies and SKM obtained the political power in Sikkim. He was appointed to the Minister of Human Resource Development, Law, Legislative & Parliamentary affairs and Land, Revenue and Disaster management in P. S. Golay Cabinet.

Electoral records 
 Sikkim Legislative Assembly election

References

1953 births
Living people
Sikkim MLAs 2014–2019
Sikkim Krantikari Morcha politicians
People from Gangtok district
Sikkim MLAs 2019–2024
Lepcha people